Overland Airways is an airline based in Ikeja in Lagos State, Nigeria. Its main base is Murtala Muhammed International Airport in Ikeja, with a hub at Nnamdi Azikiwe International Airport in Abuja.

History
The airline commenced operations in 2002 and has 194 employees. The Nigerian government set a deadline of 30 April 2007 for all airlines operating in the country to re-capitalise or be grounded, in an effort to ensure better services and safety. The airline satisfied the Nigerian Civil Aviation Authority (NCAA)'s criteria in terms of re-capitalization and was re-registered for operation.

Destinations
Domestic scheduled destinations:

Abuja, FCT - Nnamdi Azikiwe International Airport Hub
Akure, Ondo - Akure Airport
Asaba, Delta - Asaba International Airport
Bauchi, Bauchi - Sir Abubakar Tafawa Balewa International Airport
Dutse, Jigawa - Dutse International Airport
Ibadan, Oyo - Ibadan Airport
Ilorin, Kwara - Ilorin International Airport
Jalingo, Taraba - Jalingo Airport
Ikeja, Lagos - Murtala Mohammed International Airport

Fleet

The Overland Airways fleet includes the following aircraft:

Incidents and accidents 
On 12 October 2018, an Overland Airways ATR 72-202 suffered severe damage after a fire erupted during maintenance at a hangar in Murtala Muhammed International Airport. The fire was caused by the Ground Power Unit being struck by the propeller blades of the aircraft after the engine was started inside the hangar. No injuries were reported.

References

External links

Official website

Airlines of Nigeria
Airlines established in 2009
Companies based in Lagos
Nigerian companies established in 2002